The year 1878 in architecture involved some significant events.

Buildings and structures

Buildings

 Work begins on the Herrenchiemsee in Bavaria, designed by Georg Dollman.
 The Semperoper in Dresden, designed by Gottfried Semper, is completed.
 The Tower House, Kensington, designed by William Burges for himself, is completed.
 The White House and No. 1 Tite Street, Chelsea, London, designed by Edward William Godwin, are completed.
 The Michigan State Capitol in Lansing, Michigan is completed.
 Construction begins on the Indiana Statehouse Indianapolis, Indiana
 Rajabai Clock Tower in South Mumbai, India is opened.

Awards
 RIBA Royal Gold Medal – Alfred Waterhouse.
 Grand Prix de Rome, architecture: Victor Laloux.

Developments
 Thaddeus Hyatt introduces a patent for reinforced concrete to the United States.

Births
 May 3 – Ralph Knott, English architect (died 1929)
 May 21 – Arthur Joseph Davis, English Beaux-Arts architect and interior designer (died 1951)
 June 24 – James Chapman-Taylor, New Zealand Arts and Crafts domestic architect (died 1958)
 September 29 – Mārtiņš Nukša, Latvian architect and diplomat (executed 1942)
 Violet Morris, English architect (died 1958)

Deaths
 March 27 – Sir George Gilbert Scott, English Gothic revival architect (born 1811)

References

Architecture
Years in architecture
19th-century architecture